The following are the scheduled events of association football for the year 2015 throughout the world.

Events

Men's national teams

CAF 
: 
: 
: 
4th:

AFC 
: 
: 
: 
4th: 
 23 December 2015 – 3 January 2016: 2015 SAFF Championship in 
: 
:

CONCACAF 
: 
: 
: 
4th:

CONMEBOL 
: 
: 
: 
4th:

Youth (Men)

CAF
 15 February – 1 March: 2015 African U-17 Championship in 
 : 
 : 
 : 
 4th: 
 8–22 March: 2015 African U-20 Championship in 
 : 
 : 
 : 
 4th: 
 28 November – 12 December: 2015 CAF U-23 Championship in 
 : 
 : 
 : 
 4th:

CONCACAF
 9–24 January: 2015 CONCACAF U-20 Championship in 
 : 
 : 
 27 February – 15 March: 2015 CONCACAF U-17 Championship in 
 : 
 :

CONMEBOL
 14 January – 7 February: 2015 South American Youth Football Championship in 
: 
: 
: 
4th: 
 4–29 March: 2015 South American Under-17 Football Championship in 
: 
: 
: 
4th:

FIFA
 30 May – 20 June: 2015 FIFA U-20 World Cup in 
: 
: 
: 
4th: 
 17 October – 8 November: 2015 FIFA U-17 World Cup in 
: 
: 
: 
4th:

OFC
 : 
 : 
 : 
 4th:

UEFA
 6–22 May: 2015 UEFA European Under-17 Championship in 
 : 
 : 
 17–30 June: 2015 UEFA European Under-21 Championship in the 
 : 
 : 
 6–19 July: 2015 UEFA European Under-19 Championship in 
 : 
 :

Women's National Teams 
 6 June – 5 July: 2015 FIFA Women's World Cup in 
 : 
 : 
 : 
 4th:

Youth (Women)

AFC
 19–30 August: 2015 AFC U-19 Women's Championship in 
 : 
 : 
 : 
 4th: 
 4–15 November: 2015 AFC U-16 Women's Championship in 
 : 
 : 
 : 
 4th:

UEFA
 22 June – 4 July: 2015 UEFA Women's Under-17 Championship in 
 : 
 : 
 15–27 July: 2015 UEFA Women's Under-19 Championship in 
 : 
 :

Multi-sport events

Men's
 29 May – 15 June: Southeast Asian Games in 
 : 
 : 
 : 
4th: 
 2–13 July: Summer Universiade in 
 : 
 : 
 : 
4th: 
 3–17 July: Pacific Games in Port Moresby, 
 : 
 : 
 : 
 4th: 
 11–26 July: Pan American Games in Toronto, 
: 
: 
: 
4th: 
 3–18 September: All-Africa Games in Brazzaville, 
 : 
 : 
 : 
4th:

Women's
 2–12 July: Summer Universiade in 
 : 
 : 
 : 
4th: 
 6–16 July: Pacific Games in Port Moresby, 
 : 
 : 
 : 
 4th: 
 11–25 July: Pan American Games in Toronto, 
 : 
 : 
 : 
4th: 
 3–18 September: All-Africa Games in Brazzaville, 
 : 
 : 
 : 
4th:

Regional 
 27 July – 9 August: 2015 AFF U-16 Youth Championship in 
 : 
 : 
 : 
 4th:

News

February 
 5 February – The CAF Executive Committee decided to suspend the Morocco national football team from the next two editions of the Africa Cup of Nations, 2017 and 2019, and to impose on the Royal Moroccan Football Federation the regulatory fine of 1 million US dollars, along with the sum of 8.05 million euros in compensation for all material damage sustained by CAF, stakeholders and partners as a result of the decision not to host the 2015 edition.

Fixed dates for national team matches 
Scheduled international matches per the FIFA International match Calendar:
23–31 March
8–16 June
July
31 August – 8 September
5–13 October
9–17 November

Club continental champions

Men

Women

Domestic leagues

CONCACAF nations

Men

Women

CONMEBOL nations

AFC nations

Men

Women

UEFA nations

Men

Women

CAF nations

OFC nations

Domestic cups

UEFA nations

Women

AFC nations

CONCACAF nations

CONMEBOL nations

CAF nations

OFC nations

2015 Association football results

UEFA
 15 June 2014 – 4 July 2015: 2015 UEFA Regions' Cup (final in Tallaght Stadium at  Dublin)
 The  Irish Eastern Region defeated  Zagreb, 1–0, in the final.
 9 August 2014 – 14 May 2015: 2014–15 UEFA Women's Champions League (final takes place at the Friedrich-Ludwig-Jahn-Sportpark in  Berlin)
  Frankfurt defeated  Paris Saint-Germain 2–1 to win their fourth UEFA Women's Champions League title. 
 16 September 2014 – 13 April 2015: 2014–15 UEFA Youth League (final takes place at the Centre sportif de Colovray Nyon in  Nyon)
  Chelsea defeated  Shakhtar Donetsk, 3–2, to win their first UEFA Youth League title.
 16 September 2014 – 6 June 2015: 2014–15 UEFA Champions League (final takes place at the Olympiastadion in  Berlin)
  Barcelona defeated  Juventus, 3–1, to win their fifth UEFA Champions League title. Barcelona will represent UEFA at the 2015 FIFA Club World Cup.
 18 September 2014 – 27 May 2015: 2014–15 UEFA Europa League (final takes place at the National Stadium in  Warsaw)
  Sevilla defeated  Dnipro Dnipropetrovsk, 3–2, to win their fourth UEFA Europa League title.
 6–22 May: 2015 UEFA European Under-17 Championship in 
  defeated , 4–1, to win their second UEFA European Under-17 Championship title.
 17–30 June: 2015 UEFA European Under-21 Championship in the 
  defeated , 4–3 in penalties and after a 0–0 tie in regular play, to win their first UEFA European Under-21 Championship title. 
 22 June – 4 July: 2015 UEFA Women's Under-17 Championship in 
  defeated , 5–2, to win their third UEFA Women's Under-17 Championship title. 
 6–19 July: 2015 UEFA European Under-19 Championship in 
  defeated , 2–0, to win their tenth UEFA European Under-19 Championship title.
 15–27 July: 2015 UEFA Women's Under-19 Championship in 
  defeated , 3–1, to win their third UEFA Women's Under-19 Championship title. 
 11 August: 2015 UEFA Super Cup at the Mikheil Meskhi Stadium in  Tbilisi
  Barcelona defeated fellow Spanish team, Sevilla, 5–4 in extra time, to win their fourth UEFA Super Cup title.

CONMEBOL
 14 January – 7 February: 2015 South American Youth Football Championship in 
 Winner:  wins its fifth South American Youth Football Championship. (qualified directly to compete in the 2015 FIFA U-20 World Cup and the 2016 Summer Olympics)
 Second:  (qualified directly to compete in the 2015 FIFA U-20 World Cup, plus an Olympic play-off against a CONCACAF team.)
 Third:  (qualified directly to compete in the 2015 FIFA U-20 World Cup and the 2015 Pan American Games.)
 Fourth:  (qualified to same identical events as Uruguay.)
 Fifth:  (qualified to compete at the 2015 Pan American Games only.)
 Sixth:  (qualified to same event with Peru.)
 3 February – 5 August: 2015 Copa Libertadores
  River Plate defeated  UANL, 3–0 in aggregate, to win their third Copa Libertadores title. River Plate will represent CONMEBOL at the 2015 FIFA Club World Cup.
 6 & 11 February: 2015 Recopa Sudamericana (first leg at the Estadio Monumental Antonio Vespucio Liberti; second leg at the Estadio Pedro Bidegain) Both stadia are in  Buenos Aires.
  River Plate defeated fellow Argentinian team, San Lorenzo, 2–0 on aggregate, to win their first Recopa Sudamericana title.
 4–29 March: 2015 South American Under-17 Football Championship in 
 Note: These four teams qualified to compete at the 2015 FIFA U-17 World Cup.
 Winner:  (11th South American Under-17 Football Championship title)
 Second: 
 Third: 
 Fourth: 
 11 June – 4 July: 2015 Copa América in 
  defeated , 4–1 in penalties and after a 0–0 score in regular play, to win their first Copa América title.  took third place.
 11 August: 2015 Suruga Bank Championship in  Suita, Osaka
  River Plate defeated  Gamba Osaka, 3–0, to win their first Suruga Bank Championship title.
 11 August – 9 December: 2015 Copa Sudamericana
  Santa Fe defeated  Huracán, 3–1 in penalties and after a 0–0 score in regular plays, to win their first Copa Sudamericana title. 
 28 October – 8 November: 2015 Copa Libertadores Femenina in  Medellín
  Ferroviária defeated  Colo-Colo, 3–1, to win their first Copa Libertadores Femenina title.  UAI Urquiza took third place.
 21 November – 6 December: 2015 South American Under-15 Football Championship in 
  defeated , 5–4 in penalties and after a 0–0 score in regular play, to win their fourth South American Under-15 Football Championship title.  took third place.

CAF
 Note 1: As a result, for refusing to host this event,  was disqualified from participating in it. 
 Note 2: Also, Morocco is disqualified from competing in both the 2017 and 2019 editions of the event by the CAF. 
 Note 3: However, on 2 April 2015, Morocco was reinstated, by appeal, to compete in the Africa Cup of Nations again by the Court of Arbitration for Sport.
 The  defeated , 9–8 in penalties and after a 0–0 tie in regular play, to win their second Africa Cup of Nations title. The  took third place.
 13 February – 8 November: 2015 CAF Champions League
  TP Mazembe defeated  USM Alger, 4–1 on aggregate, to win their fifth CAF Champions League title. TP Mazembe will represent the CAF at the 2015 FIFA Club World Cup.
 13 February – 29 November: 2015 CAF Confederation Cup
  Étoile du Sahel defeated  Orlando Pirates, 2–1 on aggregate, to win their second CAF Confederation Cup title. 
 15 February – 1 March: 2015 African U-17 Championship in 
  defeated , 2–0, to win their first African U-17 Championship title.  took third place.
 21 February: 2015 CAF Super Cup in the Stade Mustapha Tchaker in  Blida
  ES Sétif defeated  Al Ahly, 6–5 in penalties and after a 1–1 tie in regular play, to win their first CAF Super Cup title.
 8–22 March: 2015 African U-20 Championship in 
  defeated , 1–0, to win their seventh African U-20 Championship title.  took third place.
 27 November 2015 – 27 March 2016: 2015–16 CAF U-17 Women's World Cup Qualifying Tournament
 28 November – 12 December: 2015 U-23 Africa Cup of Nations in 
  defeated , 2–1, to win their first U-23 Africa Cup of Nations title.  took third place.

AFC
  defeated , 2–1 after extra time, to claim their first AFC Asian Cup title. The  took third place.
 4 February – 21 November: 2015 AFC Champions League
  Guangzhou Evergrande defeated  Al-Ahli, 1–0 on aggregate, to win their second AFC Champions League title. 
 Guangzhou Evergrande will represent the AFC at the 2015 FIFA Club World Cup.
 10 February – 31 October: 2015 AFC Cup
  Johor Darul Ta'zim defeated  Istiklol, 1–0, to win their first AFC Cup title.
 1–10 May: 2015 AFF Women's Championship in  Ho Chi Minh City
  defeated , 3–2, to win their second AFF Women's Championship title.  took third place.
 27 July – 9 August: 2015 AFF U-16 Youth Championship in  Phnom Penh
  defeated , 3–0, to win their 3rd title.  took third place.
 1–8 August: 2015 EAFF Women's East Asian Cup in  Wuhan
 1st place:  (second consecutive EAFF Women's East Asian Cup title)
 2nd place: 
 3rd place: 
 4th place: 
 2–9 August: 2015 EAFF East Asian Cup in  Wuhan
 1st place:  (second EAFF East Asian Cup title)
 2nd place: 
 3rd place: 
 4th place: 
 9–18 August: 2015 SAFF U-16 Championship in  Sylhet
  defeated , 4–2 in penalties and after a 1–1 score in regular play, to win their first SAFF U-16 Championship title. 
 19–30 August: 2015 AFC U-19 Women's Championship in 
  defeated , 4–2 in penalties and after a 0–0 score in regular play, to win their fourth AFC U-19 Women's Championship title.  took third place.
 4–15 November: 2015 AFC U-16 Women's Championship in 
  defeated , 1–0, to win their second AFC U-16 Women's Championship title.  took the bronze medal.

CONCACAF
 5 August 2014 – 29 April 2015: 2014–15 CONCACAF Champions League
  Club América defeated the  Montreal Impact, 5–3 in aggregate, to win their sixth CONCACAF Champions League title. Club América will represent the CONCACAF Confederation at the 2015 FIFA Club World Cup.
 9–24 January: 2015 CONCACAF U-20 Championship in 
  defeated , 4–2 in penalties and after a 1–1 tie in regular play, to win its 13th CONCACAF U-20 Championship title.
 27 February – 15 March: 2015 CONCACAF U-17 Championship in 
  defeated , 3–0, to win their 6th CONCACAF U-17 Championship title.
 6 March – 25 October: 2015 Major League Soccer season
 Eastern Conference (MLS) and Supporters' Shield winners:  New York Red Bulls
 Western Conference (MLS) winners:  FC Dallas
 28 October – 6 December: 2015 MLS Cup Playoffs
 The  Portland Timbers defeated the  Columbus Crew, 2–1, to win their first MLS Cup title.
  defeated , 3–1, to win their seventh CONCACAF Gold Cup title.  took third place.
 Event cancelled.
 10 October: 2015 CONCACAF Cup in  Pasadena, California
  defeated , 3–2 at extra time.

OFC
 7 October 2014 – 26 April 2015: 2014–15 OFC Champions League (final at National Stadium in  Suva)
  Auckland City defeated fellow New Zealand team, the Team Wellington, 4–3 in a penalty shoot-out and after a 1–1 tie in regular play, to win their seventh OFC Champions League (including five consecutive wins). Auckland City will represent the OFC at the 2015 FIFA Club World Cup.
 13–26 January: 2015 OFC U-17 Championship in  Pago Pago
  defeated , 5–4 in penalties and after a 1–1 score in regular play, to win their sixth (fifth consecutively) OFC U-17 Championship title.  took third place.

Other football competitions
  defeated , 2–1 at extra time, to win their second FIFA U-20 World Cup title. This includes the 1987 title, when Serbia was part of the former . 
  took third place.
 The  defeated , 5–2, to win their third FIFA Women's World Cup title.  took third place.
 13–29 June: 2015 CPISRA Football 7-a-side World Championships at the St George's Park National Football Centre in  Burton upon Trent, Staffordshire
  defeated , 1–0, in the final.  took third place.
 7–16 August: 2015 CPISRA Football 7-a-side U19 World Championships in  Nottingham
  defeated , 3–2, in the final.  took third place.
 20–29 August: IBSA Blind Football European Championships 2015 in  Hereford
  defeated , 1–0, in the final.  took third place.
 30 August – 8 September: 2015 IBSA Blind Football Asian Championships in  Tokyo
  defeated , 1–0 in penalty kicks, in the final.  took the bronze medal.
 16–25 October: 2015 IBSA Blind Football African Championships in  Douala
  defeated , 2–0, in the final.  took the bronze medal.
 17 October – 8 November: 2015 FIFA U-17 World Cup in 
  defeated , 2–0, to win their fifth FIFA U-17 World Cup title.  took third place.
 10–20 December: 2015 FIFA Club World Cup in 
  Barcelona defeated  River Plate, 3–0, to win their third FIFA Club World Cup title.  Sanfrecce Hiroshima took third place.

Deaths

References 

 
Association football by year